Edgar Claure (born 8 August 1958) is a Bolivian judoka. He competed in the men's half-lightweight event at the 1984 Summer Olympics.

References

1958 births
Living people
Bolivian male judoka
Olympic judoka of Bolivia
Judoka at the 1984 Summer Olympics
Place of birth missing (living people)